Liberto Luis Beltrán Martínez (born 26 December 1996), sometimes known as just Liberto, is a Spanish footballer who plays for UCAM Murcia CF on loan from Albacete Balompié mainly as a left winger.

Club career
Born in Castellón de la Plana, Valencian Community, Liberto started his career at CD Castellón's youth setup. On 9 July 2014, still a youth, he was loaned to Elche CF for one year; initially assigned to the Juvenil squad, he made his senior debuts with the reserves in Segunda División B.

In July 2015 Liberto left Castellón, and subsequently returned to Elche. On 9 September he made his professional debut, starting and scoring his team's third in a 3–3 Copa del Rey away draw against UD Almería (3–4 loss on penalties).

On 14 January 2016, Liberto was loaned to CD Alcoyano in the third tier. Upon returning, he featured more regularly, and was definitely promoted to the main squad on 31 January 2017, being assigned the number 12 jersey.

On 29 August 2017, after Elche's relegation, Liberto moved to another reserve team, Betis Deportivo Balompié in the third division. Roughly one year later, he moved to fellow league team Cultural y Deportiva Leonesa on a one-year loan deal.

On 18 August 2020, after spending the previous campaign on loan at third division side Lleida Esportiu, Liberto moved to Albacete Balompié in the second level on a three-year contract. The following 22 January, after being sparingly used, he was loaned to UCAM Murcia CF for the remainder of the season.

References

External links

1996 births
Living people
Sportspeople from Castellón de la Plana
Spanish footballers
Footballers from the Valencian Community
Association football wingers
Segunda División players
Segunda División B players
Tercera División players
CD Castellón footballers
Elche CF Ilicitano footballers
Elche CF players
CD Alcoyano footballers
Betis Deportivo Balompié footballers
Cultural Leonesa footballers
Lleida Esportiu footballers
Albacete Balompié players
UCAM Murcia CF players